Harry Hiram Williams (August 23, 1879 – May 15, 1922) was an American composer, lyricist, and publisher of popular music from 1903 until his death in 1922.

One of his early hits, written in 1905 with Egbert Van Alstyne, is "In the Shade of the Old Apple Tree". He also produced story ideas and directed silent movies with Mack Sennett for Keystone Studios, according to Sennett's biography The King of Comedy. Williams joined The Lambs Club in 1908.

References

External links
 
 discogs.com/artist
 Harry Williams recordings at the Discography of American Historical Recordings.

1879 births
1922 deaths
People from Faribault, Minnesota
Songwriters from Minnesota